Senator McClain may refer to:

David H. McClain (born 1933), Florida State Senate
Edward McClain (Alabama politician) (born 1940), Alabama State Senate

See also
Senator McLane (disambiguation)